Morimus orientalis is a species of beetle in the family Cerambycidae. It was described by Reitter in 1894. It is known from Turkey, Bulgaria, and Iran.

References

Phrissomini
Beetles described in 1894